Petalouda ("butterfly") is an uninhabited islet off the coast of western Crete in the Aegean Sea. Administratively, it is part of the municipality Kissamos, in Chania regional unit.

See also
List of islands of Greece

Landforms of Chania (regional unit)
Uninhabited islands of Crete
Islands of Greece